You Are What You Is is a 1981 double album by American musician Frank Zappa. His 34th album, it consists of three musical suites which encompass pop, doo-wop, jazz, hard rock, reggae, soul, blues, new wave and country. The album's lyrics satirize a number of topics, including hippies, socialites, fashion, narcotics use, cultural appropriation, religion, televangelists and the military draft.

Production
After the release of Joe's Garage, Frank Zappa set up his home studio, the Utility Muffin Research Kitchen, and planned to release a triple LP live album called Warts and All. As Warts and All reached completion, Zappa found the project to be "unwieldy" due to its length, and scrapped it, later conceiving Crush All Boxes. Crush All Boxes would have been a single LP containing the studio recordings "Doreen", "Fine Girl", "Easy Meat" (a live recording with studio overdubs) and "Goblin Girl" on the first side, with the second side being occupied by a suite consisting of the songs "Society Pages", "I'm A Beautiful Guy", "Beauty Knows No Pain", "Charlie's Enormous Mouth", "Any Downers?" and "Conehead".

During the production of Crush All Boxes, Zappa decided to scrap the album and conceive a set of releases drawing from both Warts and All and Crush All Boxes, which would emphasize different aspects of his multiple talents, formatting the two albums into You Are What You Is, Tinsel Town Rebellion and two series of live albums, Shut Up 'n Play Yer Guitar and You Can't Do That On Stage Anymore.

Zappa had performed most of the material from You Are What You Is on a tour running from March to July 1980 with a band including Ike Willis and Ray White on guitar and vocals, Tommy Mars on keyboards, Arthur Barrow on bass and keyboards and David Logeman on drums. In 2023, Zappa Records/UMe released the live album Zappa '80: Mudd Club/Munich including the band's performance at the Mudd Club on May 8, 1980 as well as the tour's final show in Munich on July 3, 1980. 

This band recorded the basic tracks of the album in the summer of 1980 after finishing the tour, with guitarist Steve Vai and vocalist Bob Harris adding overdubs and joining the group for Zappa's fall 1980 tour. However, You Are What You Is was not released until after Tinsel Town Rebellion and Shut Up 'N Play Yer Guitar although the latter two albums included material from the fall tour.

The album also included guest appearances from former band members Jimmy Carl Black and Motorhead Sherwood from the ‘60s Mothers of Invention, as well as the first recorded solo vocals of Zappa's children Moon and Ahmet.

Music and lyrics 

You Are What You Is was described by uDiscoverMusic writer Jamie Atkins as "a thrilling ride through 20th-century pop music. Doo-wop, jazz, hard rock, reggae, soul, blues, new wave, and country are all negotiated with aplomb over a series of three sharply edited suites, rammed with witty musical phrases, call-backs, and reference points." The album is made up of three suites. The first two suites are single sides of the vinyl edition's first record, while the third suite is spread across both sides of the second record. "Harder than Your Husband" is a country rock song, while Atkins classifies "Doreen" as "power doo-wop". The reggae song "Goblin Girl" includes musical quotations from "Doreen". "Theme from the 3rd Movement of Sinister Footwear" is a jazz fusion instrumental which took guitarist Steve Vai 1–2 weeks to learn due to its complexity. It closes the album's first suite. "Mudd Club" combines barbershop quartet-style vocals and "malevolent monologues" with a "slow reggae skank".

The album's lyrics satirize a number of topics, including hippies ("Teen-age Wind"), socialites, fashion and narcotics use (the entirety of the suite that takes up side two of the album's vinyl release's first record), cultural appropriation ("You Are What You Is"), religion ("Dumb All Over"), televangelists ("Heavenly Bank Account") and the military draft ("Drafted Again").

Release and reception 

The title song was the only song of Zappa's career to have a music video. The video contained a sequence in which a man resembling then-President Ronald Reagan was electrocuted in an electric chair. MTV banned the video from airing on its network. In 1981, the album charted at #93 on the Billboard 200. In a retrospective review, AllMusic's Steve Huey wrote that while "'Jumbo Go Away' is perhaps the most offensive song in Zappa's huge canon of potentially offensive songs, [You Are What You Is] is quite ambitious in scope and in general one of Zappa's most accessible later-period efforts; it's a showcase for his songwriting skills and his often acute satirical perspective, with less of the smutty humor that some listeners find off-putting." He gave the album a score of 4 out of 5.

Track listing

Personnel

Musicians
 Frank Zappa – lead guitar, vocals
 Ike Willis – rhythm guitar, vocals
 Ray White – rhythm guitar, vocals
 Bob Harris – boy soprano, trumpet
 Steve Vai – Fender Stratocaster
 Tommy Mars – keyboards
 Arthur Barrow – bass guitar
 Ed Mann – percussion
 David Ocker – clarinet, bass clarinet
 Motorhead Sherwood – tenor saxophone, vocals
 Denny Walley – slide guitar, vocals
 David Logeman – drums
 Craig "Twister" Stewart – harmonica
 Jimmy Carl Black – vocals
 Ahmet Zappa – vocals
 Moon Unit Zappa – vocals
 Mark Pinske – vocals

Production staff
 Frank Zappa – producer
 Mark Pinske – engineer
 Alan Sides – engineer
 Bob Stone – remix engineer
 George Douglas – engineering assistant
 Dvid Gray - engineering assistant
 Amy Bernstein – artwork
 Jo Hansch – mastering
 John Livzey – photography, cover photo
 Thomas Nordegg – Frank's personnel assistant 
 Santi Rubio – Studio Secretary
 Dennis Sager – digital engineer
 John Vince – artwork, graphic design

Charts
Album - Billboard (United States)

References

1981 albums
Albums produced by Frank Zappa
Barking Pumpkin Records albums
Frank Zappa albums